Alois Pisnik (8 September 1911 – 2 October 2004) was an Austrian-born East German politician.

Life and career
In his younger years, Pisnik was member of various social-democratic youth and trade union organizations. He joined the SDAPÖ in 1928. From 1926 to 1929 he finished an apprenticeship as a machinist. Subsequently, in 1933, after another three years of training, he received a qualification as an electrical engineer. In 1934 he participated in the Austrian Civil War, in the course of which he was arrested, but freed soon after. After the Anschluss, Pisnik was yet again arrested, this time by the Nazis, and consequently sentenced to 10 years prison.

After his liberation he soon became First Secretary of the SED district chapter in Magdeburg, an office he held until 1979. Concurrently, he was a member of the district parliament of Magdeburg from 1952 to 1958. Pisnik was known as one of the longest serving members of the SED Central Committee, having been part of it from 1950 to 1989. He was also a candidate of the SED Politburo from 1958 to 1963, a member of the People's Chamber from 1958 to 1990 and a member of the National Defense Council of East Germany from 1960 to 1979.

References

1911 births
2004 deaths
Communist Party of Germany politicians
Candidate members of the Politburo of the Central Committee of the Socialist Unity Party of Germany
Austrian emigrants to East Germany